The Big 12 softball tournament (sometimes known simply as the Big 12 championship) is the conference championship tournament in college softball for the Big 12 Conference (Big 12). Since its inception in 1996, the tournament has been played at ASA Hall of Fame Stadium in Oklahoma City, Oklahoma. The winner receives the conference's automatic bid to the NCAA Division I softball tournament. The Big 12 stopped holding a postseason conference tournament after the 2010 competition. In 2017, the Big 12 Conference revised the tournament, which is still hosted at ASA Hall of Fame Stadium in Oklahoma City.

Champions

Year-by-year

By school

External links
Official website
Big 12 Softball Record Book